is a Japanese television drama series.

Cast
Miki Mizuno
Masaru Nagai

References

Japanese drama television series
2013 Japanese television series debuts